Huangtudian railway station is a railway station in Changping District, Beijing. The station was constructed in 1966. It is a 4th-class station as of 2006.

The terminus of the Line S2 of Beijing Suburban Railway was changed to this station in November 2016.

The station is located just south to Huoying station of Beijing Subway Line 8 and Line 13.

Railway stations in Beijing
Railway stations in China opened in 1966
1966 establishments in China